Charles Lapworth (13 June 1878 – 26 October 1951) was a socialist activist, journalist and film promoter.

He was born in Willenhall, Staffordshire on 13 June 1878, the son of a coal miner.

Lapworth toured with Eugene V. Debs in 1908, promoting the Industrial Workers of the World and speaking about socialism in Britain.  He returned to Britain to stand in Sheffield Brightside at the January 1910 general election for the Social Democratic Party, but took only 4.7% of the vote. He then toured Italy with his wife, investigating the socialist movement there, and wrote Tripoli and the Young Italy with Helen Zimmern.

In 1912, Lapworth again returned to Britain, to take up the editorship of the Daily Herald.  Although he increased circulation, he upset its publisher, George Lansbury, by strongly criticising Philip Snowden, and Lansbury himself replaced Lapworth as editor in late 1913.  Lapworth worked as night editor of the Daily Mail for a short time, before returning to the United States, which he toured with his family in an early Ford.  In 1918, he interviewed Charlie Chaplin, and briefly worked with him as a writer and consultant on A Dog's Life.  During the 1920s, he edited the Los Angeles Graphic newspaper, and also acted as Sam Goldwyn's agent in London. In 1925, he joined the board of Gainsborough Pictures, where he wrote film scripts including The Sea Urchin and the original story of the early Hitchcock movie, The Mountain Eagle.  He also worked as production manager with the short-lived Société Générale des Films, who made The Passion of Joan of Arc.  In 1931, he returned to Los Angeles, as editor of Film Quarterly.  Among his other projects was the co-ownership of the Rye Courier, a small newspaper based in Rye, New York.

In 1942, Lapworth launched the short-lived Malibu Bugle, the first newspaper in the city.

He died in Los Angeles, California on 26 October 1951. He left a wife and two children.

References

1878 births
1951 deaths
British film producers
British newspaper editors
British socialists
Social Democratic Federation members
Industrial Workers of the World members
20th-century British people